The Chevrolet Series AE Independence (or Chevrolet Independence) is an American vehicle manufactured by Chevrolet in 1931 to replace the 1930 Series AD Universal. Calendar year production slipped by about eight percent to 627,104 cars as the Great Depression continued, but as Ford's output plummeted by nearly two-thirds, Chevrolet reclaimed first place in the American car sales table, and the 8th million car was produced August 25, 1931. Yearly appearance changes, technical updates and standard or optional features for 1931 included the introduction of the "quail" hood ornament, a curved tie-bar connecting the headlights, wire- spoked wheels became standard equipment, while optional equipment listed front and rear bumpers, covers for side mounted spare tires, spotlights and guide lamps that would turn with the front tires. William S. Knudsen was joined with M. E. Coyle as General Managers. In May 1925 the Chevrolet Export Boxing plant at Bloomfield, New Jersey was repurposed from a previous owner where Knock-down kits for Chevrolet, Oakland, Oldsmobile, Buick and Cadillac passenger cars, and both Chevrolet and G. M. C. truck parts are crated and shipped by railroad to the docks at Weehawken, New Jersey for overseas GM assembly factories. Dedicated body style production continued while assignment changed from previous years based on demand.

Specification

The main change between the Series AE and the outgoing AD was two-inch increase to the wheelbase, which was now . It remained powered by the  "Stovebolt" six-cylinder engine, now producing . As refinement continued rubber engine mounts were now used to minimize vibration from entering the passenger cabin and a heater was optionally available. The Phaeton body style meant it was a four-passenger convertible. The Art and Color studio headed up by Harley Earl began to consolidate the appearance of all GM products which meant that for each year all GM cars looked the same with the careful observer able to distinguish the different brands. To the casual observer, the Chevrolet was more plain than the top level Cadillac while the luxury car was essentially longer with more chrome exterior features.

The Chevrolet/GMC trucks of this period served the basis for the first Bedford trucks and vans produced in the 1930s. These vehicles were built up until 1939 when the medium-heavy duty models were succeeded by the M series and the lighter models (mostly vans and pickups) were succeeded by the somewhat smaller and much more economical HC/JC/PC series.

See also
1931 Cadillac Series 355
1931 LaSalle Series 303
1931 Oldsmobile F-Series
1931 Buick Series 50
1931 Oakland

References

Series AE Independence
Cars introduced in 1931
1930s cars